John Adrian Pyle  is a British atmospheric scientist, Director of the Centre for Atmospheric Science in Cambridge, England. He is a Professor in the Department of Chemistry at the University of Cambridge, and since 2007 has held the 1920 Chair of Physical Chemistry in the Chemistry Department. He is also a Fellow of the Royal Society and of St Catharine's College, Cambridge.

Education
Pyle was educated at De La Salle College, Salford, gained his Bachelor of Science degree in Physics at Durham University and his DPhil from the University of Oxford in 1978.

Research
Pyle is known for his extensive work on atmospheric chemistry and its interactions with climate. His early research was focusing on issues related to stratospheric ozone depletion but in the following decades his work has expanded in a variety of chemistry and climate-related fields.

Pyle was appointed Commander of the Order of the British Empire (CBE) in the 2017 New Year Honours for services to atmospheric chemistry and environmental science.

References

Living people
Fellows of St Catharine's College, Cambridge
Fellows of the Royal Society
Place of birth missing (living people)
Atmospheric chemists
1951 births
Alumni of Grey College, Durham
Members of the University of Cambridge Department of Chemistry
Alumni of the University of Oxford
British physical chemists
Commanders of the Order of the British Empire
Professors of Physical Chemistry (Cambridge)